The  fourth season of Burmese competitive reality television cooking show MasterChef Myanmar or MasterChef All Stars Myanmar premiered on MRTV-4, on November 6, 2022, and concluded on March 19, 2023. The host of this season was Thazin Nwe Win and the judges were U Ye Htut Win, Daw Phyu Phyu Tin and Joseph joined as a new judge. The season was won by Hein Htet Aung, with Min Khant Maw finishing as a runner-up.

Contestants

References

Burmese television series
MasterChef
MRTV (TV network) original programming
MasterChef Myanmar